Arborg Airport  is located  west southwest of Beausejour, Manitoba, Canada.

References

Registered aerodromes in Manitoba

pms:Arborg Airport